Scott Fardy (born 5 July 1984) is an Australian rugby union player who last played for Leinster in the Pro14 & the European Rugby Champions Cup from 2019 to 2021 before retirement.  His playing position is either lock or blindside flanker. He made his Brumbies debut in Week 1 of the 2012 Super Rugby season against the Western Force in Canberra. Prior to joining Brumbies, he played for Japanese Club Kamaishi Seawaves for 3 seasons from 2009.

Fardy also played representative baseball until he was 16 years old, playing in the same team as future teammate Rocky Elsom.
Scott is now a professional coach with the Green Rockets side in Japan for the 2022 and 2023 seasons.

The Great East Japan Earthquake
While playing in Japan, on March 11, 2011, Fardy experienced the Great East Japan Earthquake. Kamaishi, the town where his team Seawaves based, was hit by tsunami and suffered a tremendous damage. On top of that, fearing a possible influence of radiation caused by the severe accident on Fukushima Daiichi Nuclear Power Station, the Australian Embassy in Tokyo advised its nationals in Japan, including Fardy, to evacuate from the country.  But Fardy refused to follow the advise and chose to remain with the team and help locals struggling to recover from the disasters. Fardy's commitment and dedication to the local community has been greatly appreciated, and on August 10, 2022, he was awarded Foreign Minister’s Commendations for FY 2022.

Leinster Rugby
He joined the Irish province Leinster at the start of the 2017/18 season and achieved European Champions Cup and PRO14 winners' medals with the province that season.
The following season, he played 22 games for the club, including playing in PRO14 final and winning another medal. Leinster lost to Saracens in the European Cup final in that season.  He was given a contract extension for another season, and is currently playing in both PRO14 and European Champions Cup competitions. Fardy earned his third straight Pro14 dream team place when he was named to the 2019–20 Pro14 team. In April 2021 Fardy announced that he would retire from rugby at the end of the season.

Super Rugby and Pro14 statistics

References

External links
Leinster profile
Wallabies profile
Brumbies profile

1984 births
Living people
Rugby union players from Sydney
Australian rugby union players
Australia international rugby union players
Rugby union locks
Rugby union flankers
ACT Brumbies players
Barbarian F.C. players
Leinster Rugby players
Perth Spirit players
Sydney (NRC team) players
Western Force players
Kamaishi Seawaves players